The 2014 National Ringette League Playoffs were the postseason tournament of 2013-14 National Ringette League season. Ottawa Ice defeated the Cambridge Turbos to win the 1st ever title.

Regular Season Standing

Format 
Top two teams in East and West clinch the Elit Eight directly and third place to tenth place team clinch the knockout stage. (this year, red division champion was Montreal Mission and it is at third since for the fair game, Montreal clinch the Elite Eight directly.) The knock out stage is best-of-three and 3 vs 10, 4 vs 9, 5 vs 8 and 6 vs 7. The winner of knockout stage go to the Elite Eight.

In Elite Eight, eight teams play a game against rest of the team and the top team clinch the final. The second and third place team clinch the semifinal.

The semifinal winner goes to the final and the winner of the final is this year's champion.

Knockout stage

(3) Ottawa vs (10) Lac St.Louis 
Game 1

Ottawa leads the series 1-0

Game 2

Ottawa wins the series 2-0

(4) Richmond Hill vs (9) Rive Sud 
Game 1

Richmond Hill leads the series 1-0

Game 2

Richmond Hill wins the series 2-0

(5) Gloucester vs (8) Gatineau 
Game 1

Gloucester leads the series 1-0

Game 2

The series ties 1-1

Game 3

Gloucester wins the series 2-1

(6) Waterloo vs (7) Bourassa 
Game 1

Waterloo leads the series 1-0

Game 2

The series ties 1-1

Game 3

Waterloo wins the series 2-1

Elite Eight 
All games were played at Cooperators Centre, Regina, Saskatchewan from April 7 to 11.
x indicates clinches the Semifinal.
y indicates clinches the Final directly.

Semifinal 
Ottawa vs Edmonton

Ottawa wins the game and goes to the Final.

Final 
Cambridge vs Ottawa

Roster 
Ottawa
 Simzer, Jayme
 McBride, Jenna
 Love, Kyrie
 Côté, Natasha
 Laviolette, Emilie
 Bateman, Alex 
 Gross, Sarah
 MacDonald, Brittany
 Goguen, Sophie
 Lugg, Katie
 Hartley, Jennifer
 Laframboise, Chloe
 Fougere, Elsa
 Lugg, Carrie
 Love, Jenna
 Goble, Tori (goalie)
Cambridge
 Findlay, Melissa
 Campbell, Taylor
 Albert, Kayla 
 Gaudet, Jennifer
 Hinde, Megan 
 Dupuis, Jenna
 Hannesson, Kacy
 Granger, Sydney
 Purbrick, Jessica
 Richards, Stacey
 Walden, Brittany
 Walden, Jessica
 Gaudet, Jacqueline
 Barey, Nadia
 McCullough, Samantha
 Jasper, Elyssa
 Pittaway, Meghan (goalie)

Leaders 
Player except goalie
Goal 
 East: Josie Scott (19, WAT)
 West: Jamie Bell (16, EDM)
Assist
 East: Katie Lugg (16, OTT)
 West: Dailyn Bell (18, EDM)
 Point
 East: Emily Bakker (31, RH)
 West: Dailyn Bell (33, EDM)
Goalie
Saving %
East Meghan Pittaway (.926, CAM)
West Breanna Beck (.894, EDM)
Goals against average
East Meghan Pittaway (2.86, CAM)
West Breanna Beck (5.27, EDM)
Win
East Meghan Pittaway (6, CAM)
West Anj Grewal, Bobbi Mattson (both are 3, EDM and CGY respectively)

References 

National Ringette League
Ringette
Ringette competitions